Ramesh Bhatkar (3 August 1949 – 4 February 2019) was a Marathi film, stage and TV actor. Of the various roles that Bhatkar portrayed, he was best known for his roles in the TV series Commander and Hello Inspector. He worked for more than 30 years as an actor in the mainstream commercial movie industries of the Marathi and Hindi languages. He died on 4 February 2019 at the age of 69 in Mumbai due to cancer.

Early life
Ramesh Bhatkar was born in 1949. His father was Snehal (Vasudeo) Bhatkar, a music director, composer, and singer. In addition to his artistic background, in his early college days Ramesh Bhatkar was a champion swimmer who played for his college's aquatic team, and was an enthusiastic kho-kho player with the reputed Vijay Club in Dadar and used to participate in Marathi drama society in the evening time as an actor .

Ramesh Bhatkar was the youngest of Snehal's three children, with his older siblings being Snehalata Bhatkar (now married to Ramkrishna Barde) and Avinash Bhatkar. Bhatkar lived in the famous Uma building at Kashinath Dhuru road opposite Kirti college, Dadar West. Famous personalities such as Anurag vaidya also live here.

Career

Movies
Bhatkar's mainstream movie debut was the film Chandoba Chandoba Bhaglaas ka (1977) followed by AshtaVinayak (1978), Duniya kari Salam, Maaherchi Manasa, Aapli Maanasa, and Maherchi Sadi (1991). He also played a groom in the film Lek Chalali Sasarla and also small roles in movies like Savat majhi Ladki.

Of his nearly 90 films, most are in Marathi, with a few in the Hindi language. He was last seen in a character loosely based on former CM of Maharashtra Prithviraj Chavhan in the film The Accidental Prime Minister.

Television
His prosperous television career included very popular detective serials such as Hello Inspector (1990) and Damini (Marathi) on DoorDarshan, Commander (1992) on Zee TV, Khoj (2000) on DD National and Teesra Dola (1998) on DD2; all these made Ramesh a very popular TV personality. He also appeared in Haddapaar, Bandini, Vikram Aur Betaal, Yugandhara. He also appeared in his early days in a small telefilm by B. P. Singh, Sirf Chaar din, a suspense/thriller.

His career includes about 30 series with more than 1,000 episodes aired.

Theatre

Marathi Theatre was Ramesh Bhatkar's first love, with very prominent lead roles in numerous plays. He played a lead role in Ashroonchi Zaali Phule (1975) which ran in the Marathi theatre industry for about 28 years. This role of "Lalya" in this play played by him was earlier made popular by Dr. Kashinath Ghanekar. But Ramesh Bhatkar also played it with equal potential and made it popular. Dr Ghanekar also appreciated it lastly.

Bhatkar was noticed in the Marathi play Mukta, where he was cast with lead actor Avinash Masurekar and actress Savita Malpekar in 1986.

For the last 30 years, Ramesh has played lead roles in such plays as Ooghadale Swargache Daar (1982), Denaryaache Haath Hazaar (1980), Shadyantra (1991), Kevha Tari Pahate,  Akher Tu Yeshilach, Rahu Ketu, Mukta, The Boss- Sutradhar, Kinara.

He has appeared in about 50 different plays overall.

Death
After a one-year battle with cancer, Ramesh Bhatkar died of cardiac arrest on 4 February 2019 at the age of 69.

Filmography
Ashtavinayak
 Aai pahije
Saheb (2012)
Tamasha – Hach Khel Udya Punha (2011)
Sai Darshan
Aai Raja Udo Udo (2010)
Maalik Ek (2010)
Umang (2010)
Asa Mi Kay Gunha Kela (2010)
Zale Mokale Aakash (2010)
Mata Ekvira Navsala Pavli (2009)
Gondya Maratay Tangada (2008)
Maazi Aai (2008)
Sakkha Bhau Pakka Vairi (2008)
Bharat Aala Parat (2007)
Aai Mala Maaf Kar (2006)
Mohityanchi Renuka (2006)
Munnabhai S S C (2005)
Kay Dyache Bola (2005)
Khabardaar (2005)
Savarkhed: Ek Gaav (2004)
Saatchya Aat Gharat (2004)
Gharandaaj (2003)
Shodh (2003)
Maratha Battalion (2002)
Jaidev (2001)
Censor (2001)
Ashi Gyaneshwari (2001)
Hafta Vasuli (1998)
Sarkarnama (1997)
Sehme Huay Sitaren (1995)
Bedardi (1993)
Bomb Blast (1993 film)
Ghayaal (1993)
Paisa Paisa Paisa (1993)
Savat Majhi Ladki (1993)
Maherchi Sadi (1991)
Bandhan (1991)
Bombay War (1990)
Lapwa Chhapwi (1990)
De Taali (1989)
Hamal de Dhamal (1989)
Aai Pahije (1988)
Rangat Sangat (1988)
Prem Karuya Khullam Khulla (1987)
Mi Chairman Boltoy (1986)
Vahinichi Maya (1985)
Sobati (1984)
Duniya Kari Salaam (1979)
Duniya Kari Salaam (1979)

Player acted

 Ughadale Swargache Daar (1982)
 Denaryaache Haath Hazaar (1980)
 Shadyantra (1991)
 Kevha Tari Pahate
 Akher Tu Yeshilach
 Rahu Ketu
 Mukta
 The Boss- Sutradhar
 Kinara
 Ashroonchi Zaali Phule
 Premachya Gava Jave

Serials / Shows acted

 Hello Inspector (2002)
 Damini
 Commander (1992) – Hindi
 Teesra Dola
 Haddapaar
 Bandini
 Yugandhar
Vikram Aur Beetal
Suspense Every Week

A (more complete) partial list is available on IMDB.

References

1949 births
2019 deaths
Male actors in Marathi cinema
Indian male television actors
Deaths from cancer in India
Male actors in Marathi television